Adonis Baths is a waterfall near Krya Vrysi and Lakkos tou Fragkou. It is located 267 m above sea level. In the village of Koili, in the province of Pafos, where Mavrokolympos flows, the waters gather and form a small waterfall. These waters over the centuries eroded the soil and formed a small lake. According to Greek mythology, this is where Adonis and Aphrodite would meet to spend time together.

References 

Paphos District
Geography of Cyprus